The 2019 Southeastern Conference football season represented the 87th season of SEC football taking place during the 2019 NCAA Division I FBS football season. The season began on August 29, 2019 and ended with the 2019 SEC Championship Game on December 7, 2019. The SEC is a Power Five conference under the College Football Playoff format along with the Atlantic Coast Conference, the Big 12 Conference, the Big Ten Conference and the Pac-12 Conference. For the 2019 season the SEC has 14 teams divided into two divisions of seven each, named East and West.

Background

Alabama brought back quarterback Tua Tagovailoa while Georgia brought back quarterback Jake Fromm. Georgia lost their defensive coordinator; Mel Tucker to Colorado as their head coach after he spent the last two seasons at Georgia after leaving Alabama with Kirby Smart. Tennessee quarterback Will McBride transferred from Tennessee thus ending his stint with the team leaving Tennessee to have a quarterback competition for the starting quarterback job. LSU added the top recruited running back in the nation, John Emery to its running back corps for the season. Missouri played a three game SEC road trip during the 2019 season and they will open the season against Wyoming.

Previous season

During the 2018 Southeastern Conference football season, Alabama won the Southeastern Conference by defeating Georgia 35-28 in the 2018 SEC Championship Game in Atlanta. Alabama went undefeated in conference play during the 2018 season. In 2018, nine of the fourteen Southeastern Conference teams had either a non losing record or a winning record in conference play.

Preseason

Recruiting classes

SEC media days
The 2019 SEC Media Days took place at the Hyatt Regency Birmingham - Wynfrey Hotel in Hoover, Alabama on July 15–18.

The preseason Polls were released in July 2019. With the Crimson Tide predicted to win the West Division, the Bulldogs predicted to win the East Division, and the Crimson Tide predicted to win the SEC overall.

Preseason awards

Preseason All-SEC media

References:

Preseason All-SEC coaches

References:

Head coaches

Rankings

* – Missouri ineligible for Coaches' Poll per NCAA sanctions due to academic misconduct.

Schedule

All times Eastern time.  SEC teams in bold.

Rankings reflect those of the AP poll for that week until week eleven when CFP rankings are used.

Regular season
The Regular season began on August 29 and will end on November 30. 2018. Southeastern Conference champion Alabama opened their 2019 conference play against South Carolina on September 14, 2019 while 2018 Southeastern Conference East champion Georgia opened their 2019 conference play against Vanderbilt on August 31.
Florida and Auburn will renew their rivalry after an eight year hiatus when they meet on October 5, 2019 in Gainesville. That matchup will also be the first time that Auburn plays in Gainesville since 2007 when Auburn defeated Florida 20-17. Florida will also be resuming another rivalry; their rivalry with Miami as they open the season against the Hurricanes in Orlando.

Week Zero

Week One

Week Two

Week Three

Week Four

Week Five

Week Six

Week Seven

Week Eight

Week Nine

Week Ten

Week Eleven

Week Twelve

Week Thirteen

Week Fourteen

Championship game

SEC records vs other conferences
2019–2020 records against non-conference foes:

Regular Season

Post Season

SEC vs Power Five matchups
The following games include SEC teams competing against teams from the ACC, Big Ten, Big 12, or Pac-12. It also includes matchups against BYU or Notre Dame. Rankings from AP poll.

SEC vs Group of Five matchups
The following games include SEC teams competing against teams from the American, C-USA, MAC, Mountain West or Sun Belt. Rankings from AP poll.

SEC vs FBS independents matchups
The following games include SEC teams competing against FBS Independents, which includes Army, Liberty, New Mexico State, or UMass. Rankings from AP poll.

SEC vs FCS matchups
The following is a list of matchups with teams competing in Football Championship Subdivision (FCS). Rankings from AP poll.

Postseason

Bowl games

 
Rankings are from final CFP rankings.  All times Eastern.

Awards and honors

Player of the week honors

SEC Individual Awards
The following individuals received postseason honors as voted by the Southeastern Conference football coaches at the end of the season

All-conference teams

*Denotes Unanimous Selection

Source:

All Conference Honorable Mentions

All-Americans

The 2019 College Football All-America Teams are composed of the following College Football All-American first teams chosen by the following selector organizations: Associated Press (AP), Football Writers Association of America (FWAA), American Football Coaches Association (AFCA), Walter Camp Foundation (WCFF), The Sporting News (TSN), Sports Illustrated (SI), USA Today (USAT) ESPN, CBS Sports (CBS), FOX Sports (FOX) College Football News (CFN), Bleacher Report (BR), Scout.com, Phil Steele (PS), SB Nation (SB), Athlon Sports, Pro Football Focus (PFF) and Yahoo! Sports (Yahoo!).

Currently, the NCAA compiles consensus all-America teams in the sports of Division I-FBS football and Division I men's basketball using a point system computed from All-America teams named by coaches associations or media sources.  The system consists of three points for a first-team honor, two points for second-team honor, and one point for third-team honor.  Honorable mention and fourth team or lower recognitions are not accorded any points.  Football consensus teams are compiled by position and the player accumulating the most points at each position is named first team consensus all-American.  Currently, the NCAA recognizes All-Americans selected by the AP, AFCA, FWAA, TSN, and the WCFF to determine Consensus and Unanimous All-Americans. Any player named to the First Team by all five of the NCAA-recognized selectors is deemed a Unanimous All-American.

*AFCA All-America Team
*AP All-America teams
*CBS Sports All-America Team
*ESPN All-America Team
*FWAA All-America Team
*Sports Illustrated All-America Team
*The Athletic All-America Team
*USA Today All-America Team
*Walter Camp All-America Team
*Sporting News All-America Team

All-Academic

National award winners
Lynn Bowden
 Paul Hornung Award

Derrick Brown
 Lott Trophy

Joe Burrow
Heisman Trophy
Maxwell Award
Johnny Unitas Golden Arm Award
Walter Camp Award
Davey O'Brien Award

Ja'Marr Chase
 Fred Biletnikoff Award

Grant Delpit
 Jim Thorpe Award

Max Duffy
 Ray Guy Award

2019 College Football Award Winners

Home game attendance

Game played at Arkansas' secondary home stadium War Memorial Stadium, capacity: 54,120.

Reference:

NFL Draft

The following list includes all SEC players drafted in the 2020 NFL Draft.

References